1214 Richilde, provisional designation , is a dark background asteroid from the central regions of the asteroid belt, approximately 35 kilometers in diameter. It was discovered by Max Wolf at Heidelberg Observatory in 1932. Any reference of the asteroid's name to a person is unknown.

Discovery 

Richilde was discovered on 1 January 1932, by German astronomer Max Wolf at the Heidelberg-Königstuhl State Observatory in southwest Germany. Five nights later, on 6 January 1932, it was independently discovered by Japanese astronomer K. Nakamura at Kwasan Observatory, Kyoto. The Minor Planet Center only recognizes the first discoverer.

Orbit and classification 

Richilde is a non-family asteroid from the main-belt's background population. It orbits the Sun in the central asteroid belt at a distance of 2.4–3.0 AU once every 4 years and 6 months (1,629 days; semi-major axis of 2.71 AU). Its orbit has an eccentricity of 0.12 and an inclination of 10° with respect to the ecliptic.

Physical characteristics 

In the SMASS, Richilde is a Xk-subtype, that transitions from the X-type to the rare K-type asteroids, while the Wide-field Infrared Survey Explorer (WISE) characterizes the body as a primitive P-type asteroid.

Rotation period and pole 

In the 1990s, a rotational lightcurve of Richilde was first obtained from photometric observations by astronomers using the ESO 1-metre telescope at the La Silla Observatory in Chile. Lightcurve analysis gave a well-defined rotation period of 9.860 hours with a brightness variation of 0.32 magnitude. In October 2006, a concurring period of 9.870 hours and an amplitude of 0.31 was measured by French amateur astronomer Raymond Poncy.

In 2011, a modeled lightcurve using data from the Uppsala Asteroid Photometric Catalogue (UAPC) and other sources gave a period 9.86687 hours, as well as a partial spin axis of (n.a.°, –59.0°) in ecliptic coordinates (λ, β).

Diameter and albedo 

According to the surveys carried out by the Infrared Astronomical Satellite IRAS, the Japanese Akari satellite and the NEOWISE mission of NASA's WISE telescope, Richilde measures between 30.70 and 39.58 kilometers in diameter and its surface has an albedo between 0.044 and 0.07.

The Collaborative Asteroid Lightcurve Link derives an albedo of 0.0517 and a diameter of 35.22 kilometers based on an absolute magnitude of 11.10.

Naming 

This minor planet is named after a common German female name. Any reference of this name to a person or occurrence is unknown.

Unknown meaning 

Among the many thousands of named minor planets, Richilde is one of 120 asteroids, for which no official naming citation has been published.

References

External links 
 Asteroid Lightcurve Database (LCDB), query form (info )
 Dictionary of Minor Planet Names, Google books
 Asteroids and comets rotation curves, CdR – Observatoire de Genève, Raoul Behrend
 Discovery Circumstances: Numbered Minor Planets (1)-(5000) – Minor Planet Center
 
 

001214
Discoveries by Max Wolf
Named minor planets
001214
19320101